Following is a list of notable Greek restaurants, which typically specialize in Greek cuisine:

 Alexis Restaurant – Portland, Oregon, U.S.
 Berbati's Pan – Portland, Oregon
 Daphne's Greek Cafe – United States
 Greek Cusina – Portland, Oregon
 Greek Islands – Illinois, U.S.
 Jimmy the Greek – Canada
 Komi – Washington, D.C.
 Little Greek – United States
 Mr. D's Greek Delicacies, Seattle, Washington
 Niko Niko's – Houston, Texas, U.S.
 Olga's Kitchen – United States
 Omega Ouzeri – Seattle
 Papa Cristo's – Los Angeles, California
 Pithari Taverna – Highland Park, New Jersey
 Showmars – based in Charlotte, North Carolina
 Yia Yia Mary's – Houston
 Zenon Taverna – New York City

See also
 Lists of restaurants

References

 
Greek